= We Are Water: A Northeast Celebration =

We Are Water: A Northeast Celebration was a series of performances featuring cellist Yo-Yo Ma and several other artists which focused on the relationship between land, water, and community. It was inspired by the waterways of Northern North America like the Connecticut River, the Atlantic ocean, and the Arctic.
